Sara or Sarah Edwards may refer to:

Sarah Edwards (mystic) (1710–1758), Colonial American mystic and missionary
Sarah Edwards (actress) (1881–1965), Welsh-born American actress
Sara Edwards (American television host) (born 1952), reporter, producer, film critic and media consultant
Sarah Edwards (legislator) (born 1953), American member of Vermont House of Representatives
Sara Edwards (born 1963), Welsh television news presenter
Sarah Edwards (cricketer) (born 1982), Australian right-handed batsman, married name Sarah Elliott
Sarah Edwards, American costume designer